Stensjön is a lake in Stockholm County, Södermanland, Sweden. It is the largest lake in Tyresta National Park.

Lakes of Stockholm County